The Last Ride of the Dalton Gang is a 1979 American Western television film directed by Dan Curtis about the Dalton Gang. It is not entirely accurate, as noted at the film's beginning.

Plot
The film follows the story of the Dalton Gang from their beginnings in Montgomery County, Kansas to their attempt to rob two banks simultaneously in Coffeyville, Kansas.

Main cast
Cliff Potts as Bob Dalton
Randy Quaid as Grat Dalton
Larry Wilcox as Emmett Dalton
Sharon Farrell as Flo Quick
Matt Clark as George "Bitter Creek" Newcomb
Royal Dano as Pa Dalton
Julie Hill as Julie Williams
John Karlen as Charlie Powers
Mills Watson as Bill Dalton
Elliott Street as Potts
Terry Kiser as Nafius, the reporter
Bo Hopkins as Billy Doolin
John Fitzpatrick as Texas Jack Broadwell
Eric Lawson as Willie Powers
Dennis Fimple as Blackface / Charlie Bright
James Crittenden as Hugh McElhennie
R.G. Armstrong as Leland Stanford
Don Collier as Frank Dalton
Dale Robertson as Judge Isaac Parker
Jack Palance as Will Smith
Harris Yulin as Jesse James
Harry Townes as Rev. Johnson
Jorge Moreno as Archulleta
Tony Palmer as Stationmaster
Mitch Carter as Gunfighter
Don Scarbrough as Clay
Larry Block as Leroy Keenan
Bubba Smith as Luther
Thor Leif Erickson as young Emmet
Buff Brady as Buffalo Bill
Dick Autry as Cole Younger
Dean Smith as Parker Deputy Sheriff

Production
Filming took place in Bronson Canyon, Columbia State Historic Park, Jamestown, and Sonora, California. The railroad scenes were filmed on the Sierra Railroad in Tuolumne County, California.

Broadcast
The film was aired in a three-hour block at 8:00 p.m. on November 20, 1979.

Reception
John J. O'Connor of The New York Times complained that the film's three-hour length was "enough to ruin any spice."

References

External links
 

1970s biographical films
1979 Western (genre) films
1979 television films
American biographical films
American Western (genre) television films
Biographical television films
Cultural depictions of Buffalo Bill
Dalton Gang
English-language television shows
Films directed by Dan Curtis
Films set in Kansas
Films set in the 1870s
Films set in the 1880s
Films set in the 1890s
Films shot in California
NBC network original films